Acrolophus horridalis is a moth of the family Acrolophidae. It is found in Brazil.

References

External links
 

Moths described in 1863
horridalis
Fauna of Brazil
Moths of South America
Insects of South America